Murder at Midnight (a.k.a. The Monster Kills) is a 1931 American pre-Code murder mystery whodunnit directed by Frank R. Strayer.

Plot summary
A murder during a game of charades at a society party leads the police to begin the hunt through the guest-list for a motive and culprit, involving a changed will and booby-trapped telephones. The killer strikes several more times to conceal his or her identity, until all is revealed.

Cast
Aileen Pringle as Esme Kennedy
Alice White as Millie Scripps
Hale Hamilton as Phillip Montrose
Robert Elliott as Inspector Taylor
Clara Blandick as Aunt Julia Gray Kennedy
Brandon Hurst as Lawrence
Leslie Fenton as Walter Grayson
William Humphrey as Colton
Tyrell Davis as The Englishman
Kenneth Thomson as Jim Kennedy
Robert Ellis as Duncan Channing

Post production
Footage from the film was re-used in The Mirror Crack'd (1980).

Preservation status
 A print is preserved in the Library of Congress collection Packard Campus for Audio-Visual Conservation. A working/alternative title is The Monster Kills.

References

External links

1931 films
1931 mystery films
American black-and-white films
Tiffany Pictures films
Films directed by Frank R. Strayer
American mystery films
1930s English-language films
1930s American films